Fall is a surname. Notable people with the surname include:

Aicha Fall (born 1993), Mauritanian sprinter
Aïda Fall (born 1986), French basketball player
Albert B. Fall (1861–1944), American politician
Ameth Fall (born 1991), Senegalese footballer
Anna Christy Fall (1855–1930), lawyer
Assane Dame Fall (born 1984), Senegalese sprint canoeist
Bamba Fall (born 1986), Senegalese basketball player
Baye Djiby Fall (born 1985), Senegalese footballer
Benjamin Fall (born 1989), French rugby union player
Brian Fall (born 1937), British diplomat
Catherine Fall, British special adviser
 Charles D. Fall, Member of the New York State Assembly from District 61
Fatou Bintou Fall (born 1981), Senegalese sprinter
François Lonseny Fall (born 1949), Guinean diplomat and politician
Henry Clinton Fall (1862–1939), American entomologist
Ibrahima Fall (politician) (born 1942), Senegalese politician
Jeremy Fall (born 1990), American magazine editor
Jim Fall (born 1962), American film and television director and film producer
Kader Fall (born 1986), Senegalese footballer
Khadi Fall (born 1948), Senegalese writer and politician
 Khadimou Fall (born 1998), American rapper known professionally as Sheck Wes
Lamine Fall (born 1992), Senegalese footballer
Leo Fall (1873–1925), Austrian composer
Loomis Fall (born 1976), American musician
Malick Fall (footballer) (born 1968), Senegalese footballer
Malick Fall (swimmer) (born 1985), Senegalese swimmer
Matar Fall (born 1982), French-born Senegalese footballer
Mbarika Fall (born 1970), Senegalese basketball player
Michael Fall (born 1980), Belgian DJ and record producer
Mike Fall (born 1961), American soccer player
Moustapha Fall, French basketball player
Pape Niokhor Fall (born 1977), Senegalese footballer
Souleymane Fall (born 1969), Senegalese footballer
Tacko Fall (born 1995), Senegalese basketball player
Wal Fall (born 1992), German footballer

See also
Falls (surname)